The anti-tunnel barrier along Israel-Gaza Strip border (sometimes referred to as the smart wall on the Israel-Gaza Strip border) is an underground slurry wall constructed by Israel along the entire  length of the Israel-Gaza Strip border to prevent anti-Israel militant groups operating in the  Gaza Strip, especially Hamas (which Israel, along with other countries, regards as a terrorist group), from infiltration into Israel by digging tunnels under the Gaza–Israel barrier. The project includes excavation to classified depths, and the construction of thick concrete walls combined with sensors and alarm devices.

The underground anti-tunnel barrier, and 81% of the barrier above the ground was completed in March 2021. The whole project was completed in December 2021. The project had been estimated to cost 3 billion shekels ($833 million) to 3.5 billion shekels ($1.11 billion). It is located entirely on Israeli land.

Background 
Because of the effectiveness of the Israel–Gaza barrier in stopping infiltration of Israel by Palestinian militants, Hamas adopted a strategy of digging tunnels under the barrier. On 25 June 2006, Palestinians used an 800-metre tunnel dug over a period of months to infiltrate Israel. They attacked a patrolling Israeli armored unit, killed two Israeli soldiers, and captured another one, Gilad Shalit.

Between January and October 2013, three other tunnels were identified – two of which were packed with explosives.

During the 2014 Gaza War, Israel encountered Hamas militants who emerged from tunnels into Israel and attacked soldiers along the border. After the war, Israel located and destroyed 32 tunnels. In 2018, Israel destroyed three new tunnels.

Underground barrier 
The anti-tunnel barrier was constructed in response to the large number of tunnels being dug by the Hamas regime, which could only be of use for infiltration by militants. In mid-2017, Israel began construction of the underground wall several meters in depth. The barrier is equipped with sensors that can detect tunnel construction.

In October 2020, sensors in the underground structure identified a Hamas tunnel. An Israeli military official called the tunnel "The most significant tunnel we have seen to date, both in terms of depth and infrastructure".

See also
 Gaza–Israel barrier

References

Gaza Strip
Border barriers
Tunnel warfare
Gaza–Israel conflict
Borders of Israel
Israel–Gaza Strip border